Michael Condrey is the co-founder and former studio head of Sledgehammer Games, which he founded with Glen Schofield after their collaboration on the popular video game franchise Dead Space. He is now the president of 31st Union, a 2K studio located in Silicon Valley, California.

Career
Condrey graduated in 1997 from the University of Washington. The following year, his senior thesis on applying biotechnology to conservation biology was published in the Molecular Ecology. After working as a scuba diving instructor and boat captain in the Cayman Islands, he began work on a graduate degree in Seattle. It was there that he launched his game development career, beginning with a summer job at Electronic Arts (EA) during the peak of Seattle's gaming explosion. Condrey later relocated to Redwood City at the EA-owned studio Visceral Games, where he became studio chief operations officer, as well as senior development director on the 2008 title Dead Space. He also worked on three other successful EA franchises: Need for Speed, FIFA and the James Bond game series.

In November 2009, Condrey and his Visceral Games colleague Glen Schofield founded Sledgehammer Games, a subsidiary of Activision operating under the company's independent studio model. Condrey likened the opportunity to work with Activision and Call of Duty to a baseball player having a call from the New York Yankees or a filmmaker hearing from Steven Spielberg After an initial attempt to create their own Call of Duty title, Condrey and Schofield collaborated with Infinity Ward on Call of Duty: Modern Warfare 3.  The game grossed $1 billion in worldwide sales in its first 16 days and took the Best Shooter prize at the 2011 Spike Video Game Awards. The following year, the game was named Game Design of the Year at the Korea Games Conference and won the Global Award from Japan Game Awards 2012 at the Tokyo Game Show.

Condrey and Schofield left their roles at Sledgehammer in February 2018, taking up executive positions within Activision. Condrey subsequently left Activision in December 2018 to help establish a new, 2K Games studio under Take Two Interactive near San Francisco in January 2019. The studio name was announced in February 2020 as 31st Union, along with announcing a second location to open in Spain.

Game credits

Industry perspective
Condrey has expressed concerns about the industry's focus on the top five blockbuster video game titles, noting that, in 2012, "there are probably 10 games that should qualify" at that tier, leaving the middle space below as a kind of game purgatory. The result, he said, has created more innovation for other platforms, genres and business models, including Apple's iOS operating system, freemium business models and social-network games. "Across the industry," Condrey said in a GamesIndustry International interview, "it's as exciting as I've ever seen it in terms of innovation and trying new things out."

Condrey has also discussed the role of microtransactions in video games. In 2019, following his departure from Activision, Condrey criticized Activision's implementation of microtranscations, saying Advanced Warfare "launched only with rewarded Supply Drops." and that the team "were driven by, and at the service of, providing fans more ways" to "express achievements", further saying "$30 for a melee weapon? Not on my watch."

References

External links
 Personal website
 Sledgehammer Games official site
 Michael Condrey Twitter feed
 MobyGames profile
 

American game designers
American chief operating officers
University of Washington alumni
Living people
American video game directors
American video game producers
Place of birth missing (living people)
Video game businesspeople
Year of birth missing (living people)